4-Hydroxyphenylpyruvate:oxygen oxidoreductase may refer to:

 4-hydroxyphenylpyruvate dioxygenase
 4-hydroxymandelate synthase